Yogendra Mandal is a Independent Nepalese politician, currently serving as the member of the 2nd Federal Parliament of Nepal. In the 2022 Nepalese general election, he won the election from Morang 5 (constituency).

References

Living people
Nepal MPs 2022–present
Year of birth missing (living people)